World Trade Center Almeda Park is an international trade, service and information centre in Cornellà de Llobregat (suburb of Barcelona), Catalonia, Spain. WTC Almeda Park has been in operation since June 2004. Currently consists of several buildings, it is planned to build a skyscraper (Hotel WTC Almeda Park) with 28 floors and rise .

External links 
 Official page of World Trade Center Almeda Park

See also 
 List of tallest buildings and structures in Barcelona

References 

Cornellà de Llobregat
Skyscraper hotels in Barcelona